"Plug It In" is a song by British electronic music duo Basement Jaxx featuring American singer JC Chasez. It was released on 29 March 2004 as the third single from their album third studio album, Kish Kash (2003), and debuted at its peak of number 22 in the United Kingdom the following month. The song also charted in Australia and Ireland, reaching numbers 43 and 45 respectively. There are various versions of the song, including a radio edit which was featured on the duo's first greatest-hits album, The Singles (2005).

Background and development
JC Chasez was said to be "in town looking for producers for his own album." Felix Buxton admits to The Scotsman that they initially did not think the collaboration with Chasez would work. "We thought he would be just another puppet who wanted to sound cool so he could be liked by tastemakers. But he was very humble and understood the irony of taking on a song about the masquerade of celebrity because it could have been written about him. And what's more, he's got a great voice."

Lisa Kekaula from Los Angeles, California, planned to sing "Plug It In", but it did not work out, so they wrote a new song for her on the spot: "Good Luck". "We thought we'd better write a song otherwise we've wasted all our money," said Felix.

Critical reception
John Bush from AllMusic picked the song as one of the highlights of Kish Kash, stating that Chasez "is a surprising success" on the song and calling it "beguiling." Paul Mulvey of NME wrote the track, in other hands, "would result in shambles. But Basement Jaxx have a knack of orchestrating wreckage like few other producers, and this is a mighty record: brash, audacious, heroically over-excited." A Pitchfork review said the song "bathes Chasez in a tide of sighs, brutish synths and whipsmart drum breaks."

Music video
The music video, directed by Traktor, takes place at a factory. The factory, called "Second Hand Super Models", manufactures lifelike female robots. Basement Jaxx play two security guards at the facility. The boss of the company hires Chasez as a salesman to advertise the robots on TV. When Chasez agrees to do the commercial, the boss puts on a pig mask and makes Chasez wear one too. The video shows footage from Chasez's commercials, which are styled like as seen on TV ads. After watching the commercials on their security cameras, the two guards test out the new robots on the factory floor. The guards eventually go too far with the controls, causing the robots to malfunction and catch fire. The boss runs in horrified to see the destruction, and puts his pig mask back on as he mourns what is left of the robots.

Track listings
UK CD single
 "Plug It In" (featuring JC Chasez)
 "Rendez-Vu" (Roger's Secret mix)

UK 12-inch single
A1. "Plug It In" (extended club house mix)
A2. "Rendez-Vu" (Roger's Secret mix)
B1. "Plug It In" (Armand van Helden remix)

UK DVD single
 "Plug It In" (video)
 "Plug It In" (Tab mix audio)

Australian and New Zealand CD single
 "Plug It In" (radio edit featuring JC Chasez)
 "Rendez-Vu" (Roger's Secret mix)
 "Plug It In" (Tab mix)
 "Plug It In" (Armand van Helden remix)
 "Plug It In" (extended house mix)

Charts

Weekly charts

Year-end charts

References

External links
 Lyrics of this song at Lyrics.com

2003 songs
2004 singles
Basement Jaxx songs
JC Chasez songs
Songs written by Felix Buxton
Songs written by Simon Ratcliffe (musician)
XL Recordings singles